Alberto Alvarado may refer to:

 Alberto Alvarado Arámburo (1925–1996), Mexican politician
 Alberto Alvarado (footballer) (born 1988), Mexican footballer
 Alberto Alvarado (tennis), El Salvadoran tennis player; see El Salvador at the 2019 Pan American Games